This is a list of the Australian moth species of the family Thyrididae. It also acts as an index to the species articles and forms part of the full List of moths of Australia.

Subfamily Siculodinae

Rhodoneurini
Addaea aneranna Turner, 1915
Addaea fragilis Warren, 1899
Addaea fulva Warren, 1907
Addaea polyphoralis (Walker, 1866)
Addaea pusilla (Butler, 1887)
Addaea subtessellata Walker, 1866
Kanshizeia hemicycla (Meyrick, 1886)
Mellea ordinaria (Warren, 1896)
Oxycophina theorina (Meyrick, 1887)
Rhodoneura aurata (Butler, 1882)

Siculodini
Abrotesia griphodes Turner, 1915
Calindoea atripunctalis (Walker, 1866)
Calindoea dorilusalis (Walker, 1859)
Calindoea polygraphalis (Walker, 1866)
Collinsa cuprea (Pagenstecher, 1884)
Collinsa submicans (Warren, 1908)
Hypolamprus bastialis (Walker, 1859)
Hypolamprus crossosticha (Turner, 1911)
Hypolamprus hypostilpna (Turner, 1941)
Hypolamprus melilialis (Swinhoe, 1900)
Hypolamprus reticulata (Butler, 1886)
Hypolamprus sciodes Turner, 1911
Hypolamprus semiusta Warren, 1908
Hypolamprus ypsilon (Warren, 1899)
Microbelia giulia (Swinhoe, 1902)
Microbelia molybditis (Turner, 1915)
Novobelura dohertyi (Warren, 1897)
Pharambara micacealis Walker, 1866
Pharambara splendida Butler, 1887
Picrostomastis marginepunctalis (Leech, 1889)
Picrostomastis subrosealis (Leech, 1889)

Subfamily Striglininae
Aglaopus carycina (Turner, 1915)
Aglaopus centiginosa (T.P. Lucas, 1898)
Aglaopus ferruginea (Whalley, 1976)
Aglaopus floccosa (Warren, 1905)
Aglaopus gemmulosa (Whalley, 1976)
Aglaopus innotata (Warren, 1904)
Aglaopus irias (Meyrick, 1887)
Aglaopus loxomita (Turner, 1906)
Aglaopus parata (Whalley, 1976)
Aglaopus pyrrhata (Walker, 1866)
Aglaopus stramentaria (T.P. Lucas, 1898)
Banisia fenestrifera Walker, 1863
Banisia lobata (Moore, 1882)
Banisia myrsusalis (Walker, 1859)
Banisia placida Whalley, 1976
Canaea hyalospila (Lower, 1894)
Canaea semitessellalis (Walker, 1866)
Mathoris loceusalis (Walker, 1859)
Striglina asinina Warren, 1899
Striglina buergersi Gaede, 1922
Striglina cinnamomea (Rothschild, 1915)
Striglina meridiana Whalley, 1976
Striglina navigatorum (R. Felder & Rogenhofer, 1873)
Striglina scitaria (Walker, 1862)

External links 
Thyrididae at Australian Faunal Directory

Australia